Freedom of the press in Bangladesh refers to the censorship and endorsement on public opinions, fundamental rights, freedom of expression, human rights, explicitly mass media such as the print, broadcast and online media as described or mentioned in the constitution of Bangladesh. The country's press is legally regulated by the certain amendments, while the sovereignty, national integrity and sentiments are generally protected by the law of Bangladesh to maintain a hybrid legal system for independent journalism and to protect fundamental rights of the citizens in accordance with secularism and media law. In Bangladesh, media bias and disinformation is restricted under the certain constitutional amendments as described by the country's post-independence constitution.

The Penal Code, one of the criminal codes deals with the media crime, which according to the law may be applicable to all substantive aspects of criminal law. The digital and offline communications such as print, television, radio, and internet are exercised under a set of provisions such as Information and Communication Technologies Act, Digital Security Act and Broadcast Act, which in particular deals with press-related issues, including arrest without warrant. It allows a journalist or media industries to publish news stories without impacting national security of the country.

Global ranking 
In 2020, Reporters Without Borders, a non-government organisations deducted to safeguard independent journalism, published Press Freedom Index, an annual report indicating decline in press freedom of Bangladesh. The country's ranking dropped to 151 out of 180 following the persistent violations of human rights, involving alleged prosecutions, arrests of journalists and restricting media industries to access certain information, including elections. Bangladesh's press freedom ranking was primarily declined due to several other issues such as "violence by political activists", arbitrary blocking of news publishers, self-censorship, restricting some news media from attending government press conferences, arbitrary arrest and detention, physical attacks carried out against journalists by political activists, including by Awami League headed by Sheikh Hasina, 10th prime minister of Bangladesh in office since 2009. In 2018, the country's rank was 146.

Censorship on press 

The government of Bangladesh is claimed to have been involved in direct and self-censorship after introducing Digital Security Act in 2018 which has been a subject of dispute between government and non-government organisations. In 2020, the enforcement agencies detained at least 20 journalists along with 60 other people under the law for alleged social media posts. 

A Bangladeshi journalist Shafiqul Islam Kajol who disappeared for 53 days after criticising sex trafficking by ruling political party's official was according to the human rights activists forcibly disappeared before he was sentenced seven years in jail under the Digital Security Act. Odhikar, a Bangladeshi human rights organisation alleged the law has primarily been exercised by businessmen and politicians.

Bangladesh authorities blocked 54 news websites, including opposition party's web portal and Al Jazeera, a foreign broadcaster over security issues. On 1 June 2018, the government also blocked the online edition of The Daily Star newspaper.

Cult of personality 

The leaders have consistently upheld the personality cult during the past election campaigns. The journalists and human rights activists in the country are argued to have experienced troubles since Awami League came into power. In 2018 general election, the opposition political partys' agents were restricted to attend the pooling stations. The violence between opposition and ruling political party activists killed at least 17 people. In June 2020, the authorities detained a 15 years old child for sharing a "defamatory" Facebook posts which according to the government was an attempt to defame Sheikh Hasina.

While supporting the regime, Bangladeshi media reports are often one-sided and exaggerated, playing little or no role in gathering true information. Although, fake news is regarded one of the media crimes, the government itself is argued engaged in spreading false information. Sometimes, only news that favours ruling parties is published by the government-sponsored media, whilst news that criticises government actions experience threats.

The government, according to news media is argued providing propaganda on its platform. The independent newspapers running in the country reportedly spread false information amid COVID-19 pandemic, leading detention of journalists.

References 

Law of Bangladesh
Censorship in Bangladesh
Bangladeshi journalism